Charles River may refer to:

Rivers 
 Charles River, short river to Boston Harbor, in Massachusetts, United States
 Charles River (Maine) in Maine, United States
 Charles River (Virginia) in Virginia, United States
 Charles River was the name given to the Delaware River by explorers Robert Evelin and Thomas Young in 1634.

Other 
 Charles River Laboratories, a major US biomedical company
 Charles River Ventures, a venture capital firm

See also